Turković or Turkovic may refer to:

Almir Turković (born 1970), Bosnian retired professional football forward
Bisera Turković (born 1954), Bosnian diplomat and politician
Dževad Turković (born 1972), Croatian former football player
Hrvoje Turković (born 1943), Croatian film scholar
Ksenija Turković (born 1964), Croatian jurist and judge
Milan Turković (born 1939), Croatian-born Austrian bassoonist
Nedo Turković (born 1989), Bosnian footballer
Nika Turković (born 1995), Croatian singer
Petar Turković (born 1957), Croatian psychotherapist, master of martial arts, and sports executive
Petar Dragan Turković (1855–1916), Croatian businessman and nobleman
Šeki Turković (born 1953), Serbian turbo-folk singer from Sandžak
Turković family, Croatian business and noble family from Kutjevo

Bosnian surnames
Croatian surnames